Hugues Fournel (born 5 August 1988) is a Canadian kayaker. He was born in Lachine, Quebec. Fournel was the 2011 Pan American champion in the men's K-2 200 m together with Ryan Cochrane. He competed in K-2 200 and 1000 m together with Cochrane at the 2012 Summer Olympics in London.

On August 1, 2016 (after the suspension of the Russian crew) he and Cochrane was named to Canada's 2016 Olympic team in the men's K-2 200 m event.  They finished last in the final.

His father Jean and sister Emilie are also both Olympic kayakers.

References

External links
 
 

1988 births
Living people
People from Lachine, Quebec
Canoeists from Montreal
Canadian male canoeists
Canoeists at the 2012 Summer Olympics
Canoeists at the 2016 Summer Olympics
Olympic canoeists of Canada
Pan American Games gold medalists for Canada
Pan American Games medalists in canoeing
Canoeists at the 2011 Pan American Games
Université Laval alumni
Medalists at the 2011 Pan American Games